The Greek football PSAP awards are a number of awards given annually by the Greek Union of Professional Football Players (PSAP). These awards are given annually to players playing in the Super League Greece, Super League Greece 2 and Gamma Ethniki. Managers and referees are also awarded by the PSAP on an annual basis.

Super League Greece Awards

Best Greek Player of the Year Award

By player

By club

Best Foreign Player of the Year Award

By player

By club

By country

Best Young Player of the Year Award

By club

Best Goalkeeper of the Year Award

By player

By club

By country

Best Coach of the Year Award

By coach

By club

By country

Team of the Year

2013–14

2014–15

2015–16

2016–17

2017–18

2018–19

2019–20

2020–21

2021–22

Most appearances

By player

By club

By country

Super League 2 Awards

Best Player of the Year Award

By club

Best Foreign Player of the Year Award

By club

By country

Best Young Player of the Year Award

By club

Best Goalkeeper of the Year Award

By club

Coach Awards

Gamma Ethniki Awards

Best Player of the Year Award

Best Young Player of the Year Award

Best Goalkeeper of the Year Award

Referee of the Year Award

Fair Play of the Year Award

Greek Player of the Year Abroad Award

See also
Super League Greece
Football records and statistics in Greece

References

Football in Greece
Association football trophies and awards by country
Awards established in 1995
Association football in Greece lists
1995 establishments in Greece
Greek awards
Annual events in Greece